Más y Menos are fictional superhero twins, around the age of 12, from the Teen Titans animated television series, affiliated with the Titans East team. They are among the few heroes on the series not to have originated in the comic book. Taken out of context, their names translate from Spanish to "More and Less", but in their particular context (i.e. the symbols on their chests and their rallying cry), their names mean "Plus and Minus" as both "más" and "menos" can be used as mathematics terms. Más y Menos are both voiced by Freddy Rodriguez.

Fictional character biography

Teen Titans (TV series 2003-2006 and tie-in comics)
Más y Menos are a pair of Spanish-speaking twins from Guatemala who can move at superhuman speeds, but only when they are in contact with each other, possess a mental link, and are also known for their battle cry "¡Más o Menos, sí podemos!" which translates as, "Plus or Minus, yes we can!". First appearing in the Teen Titans episode "Titans East" as founding members of the titular team, they establish a base in Steel City with help from Cyborg so they can locate Brother Blood. However, Blood attacks and brainwashes Titans East before forcing them to attack Cyborg. The original Teen Titans arrive to help and free Titans East from Blood's control while Cyborg defeats Blood himself.

In the episode "For Real", Control Freak uses his remote control to force Más y Menos to speak English, though the effect wears off as of "Calling All Titans", in which they battle Johnny Rancid and Cinderblock, but get separated when Menos is captured. An escaping Más seeks out Beast Boy for help and use his link to locate his brother, but the link gets severed when the Brotherhood of Evil flash-freeze Menos. In "Titans Together", Más and Beast Boy join forces with Pantha, Herald, and Jericho to rescue their fellow Titans and defeat the Brotherhood.

In Teen Titans Go!, Más y Menos race Kid Flash, who despite being faster than them, loses because of his overconfidence.

Mainstream DC comics
Both characters later appeared in the mainstream DC Comics.

In Teen Titans #38, Más y Menos joined—and left—the Teen Titans during the missing year after the Infinite Crisis. They are also portrayed as being older than their animated counterparts.

In Final Crisis #1, they team up with Sparx and Empress to battle the Mirror Master and Doctor Light. After a short battle in which the villains win, the two are laid out, impaled with shards of glass. The Director's Cut states that they survived, albeit in bad condition; they can be seen limping in the foreground to the Hall of Justice in a later panel.

Más y Menos appear in a pin-up drawn by Brett Booth in Teen Titans #100, the final issue of the series. They are shown in a high-speed water balloon fight with Kid Flash.

Powers and abilities
Due to their connection to the Speed Force, Más y Menos have metahuman powers that allow them to move at superhuman speed whenever they are touching each other, with their maximum velocity being stated to be seven times the speed of sound, and can use their speed to vibrate their bodies and generate heat. Additionally, they share a mental link that allows them to locate each other and sense each other's pain while they are conscious.

Other versions
 Más y Menos appear in issue #16 of the Tiny Titans comic book.
 Más y Menos appear in the Teen Titans Go! 2013 tie-in comic book.

In other media
 Más y Menos appear in Teen Titans Go!, voiced again by Freddy Rodriguez.
 Más y Menos make a cameo appearance in Teen Titans Go! To the Movies.

References

External links
Official website of Teen Titans animated series  at Cartoon Network
Profile at ToonZone.net

Comics characters introduced in 2006
DC Comics characters who can move at superhuman speeds
DC Comics male superheroes
DC Comics metahumans
Fictional Guatemalan people
Latin American superheroes
Fictional twins
Characters created by Geoff Johns
Characters created by Tony S. Daniel
Superhero duos
DC Comics superheroes
Television characters introduced in 2005